Santa Rosa Airport may refer to:

 Santa Rosa Airport (Argentina) in Santa Rosa, La Pampa Province, Argentina
 Santa Rosa Airport (Bolivia) in Santa Rosa, Beni, Bolivia
 Santa Rosa Airport (Brazil) in Santa Rosa, Rio Grande do Sul, Brazil
 Santa Rosa Airport (Ecuador) in Santa Rosa, El Oro, Ecuador

See also
Santa Rosa Route 66 Airport in Santa Rosa, New Mexico, United States
Naval Outlying Landing Field Santa Rosa in Milton, Florida, United States
Charles M. Schulz - Sonoma County Airport in Santa Rosa, California, United States